"Essence" is a song by Nigerian singer Wizkid, featuring fellow Nigerian singer Tems. It was released on 30 October 2020, as the fourth single from Wizkid's fourth studio album, Made in Lagos. "Essence" was produced by P2J and Legendury Beatz. The "sensual" song sees the duo express their desire for each other. A music video was released on 9 April 2021, shot in Accra, Ghana. "Essence" is the first Nigerian song in history to chart on the Billboard Hot 100 and the Billboard Global 200.<ref
name="Billboard"></ref> The song received a nomination at the 64th Annual Grammy Awards for Best Global Music Performance.

Background and composition
After the song garnered popularity, Tems said that although she was "happy" with her first recording of the song, she felt her verse could have been better. However, Wizkid and his team thought her vocals were great and ultimately kept it. Tems recalled hearing the song "in the most random places", while in Los Angeles.

"Essence" is an Afrobeats/Afro-pop and R&B song. Lyrically, it sees Wizkid and Tems yearning for each other's physical connection; deemed a "flirtatious" song, the artists deliver "tongue-in-cheek showboating". As observed by NPR's Sidney Madden, the song features Tems singing the chorus about how only her lover can give her the feeling of "lust and obsession and worship that she deserves", with the lyrics "You don't need no other body. You don't need no other body".

Critical reception

Henrietta Taylor of Nigerian publication DST lauded the collaboration, writing: "The Nigerian artists make a formidable duo in the glossy Afrobeats single, with the more established Wizkid giving rising-star Tems a platform to give listeners a glimpse of her knock-out vocals". Praising the chorus as "the hook that keeps on giving", NPR's Sidney Madden opined that the song was not immediately appreciated, due to COVID-19, writing: "this song didn't really get the justice or even the fair playing field it deserved because we were all inside, we were all quarantined. But now that concerts and outdoor picnics and anywhere where the communal experience of music is appreciated is coming back, this song is going to be everywhere, and it's going to continue to go up". Calling the track a perfect mix of Afropop and R&B, Pan African Music said the duo "present an ode to lust" as they "embody sexual desire, advocating a sense of reciprocity". Regina Cho of Revolt deemed the song a stand-out from Made in Lagos, calling Tems's verse "sensual". GRM Daily's Courtney W called it a "silky, smooth" offering. Conversely, NME called the track "expendable".

In 2021, "Essence" was ranked as the number one best song of 2021 by American magazine Rolling Stone.

Other
"Essence" was included in Spotify's Song of the Summer playlist in June 2021, and in Barack Obama's favourite songs of 2020 playlist.

Music video
The music video was released on 9 April 2021. Directed by Director K of PriorGold Pictures, and produced by Leke Alabi Isama, it was shot in Accra, Ghana. It was the fourth video to be released from Made in Lagos. The visual sees Wizkid and Tems lounging in the streets of Accra, while Wizkid is later seen riding in a car with two women. The video was considered "colourful" and "scintillating",  with GRM Daily saying, "The visuals perfectly coincide with the track's blissful feel and include colourful fits, scenic shots and good vibes". Rolling Stone said the artists "glow, Wiz bare-chested and draped in diamonds, Tems in slick braids and flowing garb".

Justin Bieber remix

A remix of "Essence" featuring additional vocals from Canadian singer Justin Bieber was released on 13 August 2021, and appears on the deluxe edition of Made in Lagos.

Accolades

Credits and personnel
Credits adapted from Tidal.
 Wizkid – vocals, songwriting
 Tems – vocals, songwriting
 Justin Bieber – vocals, songwriting (remix only)
 Legendury Beatz
 Uzezi Oniko – songwriting, production
 Mut4y – songwriting, production
 P2J – songwriting, production
 Heidi Wang – assistant engineering (remix only)
 Benjamin Rice – engineering (remix only)
 Colin Leonard – mastering
 Leandro Hidalgo – mixing
 Josh Gudwin – recording, vocal production (remix only)

Charts

Weekly charts

Year-end charts

Certifications

Release history

Notes

References

 

2020 songs
2021 singles
Wizkid songs
Justin Bieber songs
Nigerian afropop songs
Nigerian rhythm and blues songs
RCA Records singles
Songs written by Justin Bieber
Songs written by Wizkid
Tems (singer) songs
Songs written by Tems (singer)